My Life: The Greatest Hits is a double-CD greatest hits album by Julio Iglesias, released in 1998 on Columbia Records.

The album contains a special selection of 37 songs Julio Iglesias had recorded over four decades.

My Life is one of the five editions of the album released simultaneously in different languages for different world markets.  In addition to the original version in Spanish, the album also saw Portuguese, Italian, and French releases.  All editions of the album have some overlap in the track listings due to the inclusion of several tracks in Spanish and English in all the versions.

Reception 
Having sold 6,000 copies in the United States in its first week of release, My Life: The Greatest Hits debuted at number 4 in the Billboard Latin 50 (now Billboard Latin Albums) chart on the week of October 24, 1998.

Track listing

Disc 1

Disc 2

Charts

Certifications

References 

1998 compilation albums
Julio Iglesias albums
Columbia Records compilation albums